This is a list of persons named after Saint Francis Xavier. The list includes cognates of the name Francis Xavier in other languages, including:
Francesc Xavier – Catalan
Francesco Saverio – Italian
Francisco Javier – Spanish
Francisco Xavier – Portuguese
Franciszek Ksawery – Polish
François Xavier – French
František Xaver – Czech
Franz Xaver – German

Persons
A. F. X. Baron (Anthony Francis Xavier Baron) (1913–1974), British far-right political figure of the 1940–1950s
Antoine Labelle (François-Xavier-Antoine Labelle) (1833–1891), Roman Catholic priest; principally responsible for the settlement (or "colonization") of the Laurentians
Antonio Francisco Xavier Alvares (1836–1923), Portuguese Roman Catholic priest in Goa and British India
Antonio Soler (Antonio Francisco Javier José Soler Ramos), (1729–1783), Spanish composer of the late Baroque and early Classical periods
Auguste Comte (Isidore Auguste Marie François Xavier Comte) (1798–1857), French philosopher; founder of the discipline of sociology
Brennan Manning (Richard Francis Xavier Manning) (born 1934), American author, friar, priest, and speaker
Charles F. X. O'Brien (1879–1940), American politician from New Jersey; U.S. Representative
Charles de Limburg Stirum (Charles Gaëtan Corneille Marie François-Xavier Ghislain de Limburg Stirum) (1906–1989), Belgian nobleman and senator; Grand Master of the House of King Leopold III
Chechu (Francisco Javier Flores Gómez) (born 1982), Spanish professional football player
Don Francisco Javier Sauza (1903–1990), Mexican businessman
Eugenio Espejo (Francisco Javier Eugenio de Santa Cruz y Espejo) (1747–1795), Ecuadoran physician, writer, and lawyer
F. X. Martin (Francis Xavier Martin) (1922–2000), Irish cleric, historian, and activist
Fran (footballer, born 1969) (Francisco Javier González Pérez), Spanish professional football player
Fran Healy (baseball) (Francis Xavier Healy) (born 1946), American professional baseball player
Fran Moreno (Francisco Javier Moreno Jiménez) (born 1984), Spanish professional football player
Frances Xavier Cabrini (Mother Cabrini) (1850–1917), first American citizen to be canonized by the Roman Catholic Church
Francesc Arnau (Francesc Xavier Arnau Grabulosa) (born 1975), Catalan Spanish professional football player
Francesc Xavier Butinyà i Hospital (1834–1899), Catalan missionary Jesuit, teacher, and writer
Francesco Geminiani (Francesco Saverio Geminiani) (1687–1762), Italian violinist, composer, and music theorist
Francesco Saverio de Zelada (1717–1801), Spanish cardinal of the Roman Catholic Church and diplomat of the Holy See
Francesco Saverio Mergalo (1746–1786), Italian painter of the Rococo or late-Baroque period
Francesco Saverio Merlino (1856–1930), Italian lawyer, anarchist activist, and theorist of libertarian socialism
Francesco Saverio Nitti (1868–1953), Italian economist and politician; Prime Minister of Italy 1919–20
Francis Bianchi (Saint Francis Xavier Bianchi), (1743–1815), Italian Barnabite priest
Francis Healy (baseball) (Francis Xavier Paul Healy) (1910–1997), American professional baseball player
Francis X. Bushman (1883–1966), American actor, film director, and screenwriter
Francis X. Cretzmeyer (1913–2001), American collegiate track and field coach
Francis X. DiLorenzo (born 1942), American bishop of the Roman Catholic Church; bishop of the Diocese of Honolulu, Hawaii; bishop of the Diocese of Richmond, Virginia
Francis X. Prefontaine (François Xavier Préfontaine) (1838–1909), French Canadian missionary; founded the first Catholic parish in Seattle
Francis Xavier Caldwell (1792–1851), Canadian businessman and political figure
Francis Xavier Clooney (born 1950), American priest and professor
Francis Xavier Dercum (1856–1931), American physician
Francis Xavier Ford (1892–1952), American Roman Catholic missionary to China
Francis Xavier Gartland (1805–1854), Irish American prelate of the Roman Catholic Church, Bishop of Savannah, Georgia
Francis Xavier Gsell (1872–1960), Australian Roman Catholic bishop and missionary to Papua
Francis Xavier Irwin (born 1934), retired Auxiliary Bishop in the Archdiocese of Boston
Francis Xavier Krautbauer (1828–1885), bishop of the Roman Catholic Diocese of Green Bay, Wisconsin
Francis Xavier Kurrupuwu (born 1961), Australian politician
Francis Xavier Lasance (1860–1946), American priest and writer of Roman Catholic devotional works
Francis Xavier Leray (1825–1887), French-born prelate of the Roman Catholic Church; Bishop of Natchitoches and Archbishop of New Orleans
Francis Xavier Mancuso (1887–1970), American politician, leader of Tammany Hall
Francis Xavier Patrizi (1797–1881), Italian Jesuit exegete
Francis Xavier Pierz (1785–1880), Austrian Roman Catholic priest and missionary to North America
Francis Xavier Plessis (born 1694), clergyman of New France, missionary to the First Nations
Francis Xavier Schmalzgrueber (1663–1735), German Jesuit canonist
Francis Xavier Seelos (1819–1867), German-American Roman Catholic priest
Francis Xavier Vira Arpondratana (born 1955), Bishop of Chiang Mai, Thailand
Francis Xavier Weninger (1805–1888), Austrian Jesuit missionary and author
Francisco Arce (Francisco Javier Arce Rolón) (born 1971), Paraguyan professional football player
Francisco Arce Montes (Francisco Xavier Arce Montes) (born 1950), Spanish serial abuser and murderer; imprisoned
Francisco Arias Cárdenas (Francisco Javier Arias Cárdenas) (born 1950), Venezuelan politician, military officer, and ambassador
Francisco Barraza (Francisco Javier Barraza Rodríguez) (born before 1991), Mexican band musician
Francisco Barrio (Francisco Javier Barrio Terrazas) (born 1950), Mexican politician; governor and government minister
Francisco Barrios (Francisco Javier (Jiménez) Barrios) (1953–1928), Mexican professional baseball player
Francisco Cerezo (Francisco Javier Cerezo Perales) (born 1971), Spanish professional football player
Francisco Clavet (Francisco Javier Clavet González) (born 1968), Spanish professional tennis player and coach
Francisco Cordero (Francisco Javier Cordero) (born 1975), Dominican professional baseball player
Francisco Felix (Francisco Javier Felix) (born 1983), Mexican American professional baseball player
Francisco Ibáñez Campos (Francisco Javier Ibáñez Campos) (born 1986), Chilean professional football player
Francisco J. Santamaría (1886–1963), Mexican writer and politician
Francisco Javier Aguilar García (born 1949), Spanish professional association football player
Francisco Javier Alegre (1729–1788), Jesuit scholar, translator, and historian of New Spain
Francisco Javier Álvarez Colinet (born 1983), Spanish musician; member of the boyband D'NASH
Francisco Javier Arana (1905–1949), member of the revolutionary junta that ruled Guatemala 1944–45
Francisco Javier Arellano Félix (born 1969), Mexican drug lord and leader of the Tijuana Cartel
Francisco Javier Benet (born 1968), Spanish Olympic decathlete
Francisco Javier Castaños, 1st Duke of Bailén (1758–1852), Spanish general officer
Francisco Javier Clavijero (1731–1787), Novohispano Jesuit teacher, scholar, and historian
Francisco Javier Cruz (born 1966), Mexican professional football player
Francisco Javier de Balmis (1753–1819), Spanish physician who headed an 1804 expedition to New Spain to vaccinate the populations against smallpox
Francisco Javier de Burgos y Sarragoiti (1842–1902), Spanish journalist and author of comic theater
Francisco Javier de Elío (1767–1822), Spanish military governor of Montevideo and last Viceroy of the Río de la Plata
Francisco Javier de Istúriz y Montero (1790–1871), Spanish politician and diplomat
Francisco Javier de la Torre (fl. 1764–1765), Spanish governor-general of the Philippines 1764–65
Francisco Javier de Lizana y Beaumont (1750–1811), Spanish bishop of Mexico and viceroy of New Spain 1809–10
Francisco Javier de Morales y Castejón de Arrollo (fl. 1770–1772), Spanish soldier and interim governor of Chile from 1770–72
Francisco Javier de Viana (1764–1820), Argentine sailor, soldier, and politician
Francisco Javier Domínguez Brito (born 1965), Dominican Republic politician
Francisco Javier Echeverría (1797–1852), Mexican businessman and politician; president of Mexico 1841
Francisco Javier Errázuriz Ossa (born 1933), Chilean Cardinal Priest and the Archbishop of Santiago
Francisco Javier Errázuriz Talavera (born 1942), Chilean businessman and former presidential candidate
Francisco Javier Fernández (born 1977), Spanish Olympic race walker
Francisco Javier García Fajer (1730–1809), Spanish composer
Francisco Javier García Guerrero (born 1976), Spanish professional football player
Francisco Javier García (born 1987), Spanish professional footballer
Francisco Javier Gaxiola (1870–1933), Mexican  lawyer, politician and diplomat
Francisco Javier Gómez Noya (born 1983), Spanish triathlete
Francisco Javier González (Mexican footballer) (born 1984), Mexican professional football player
Francisco Javier González-Acuña (contemporary), Mexican mathematician and professor
Francisco Javier Gutiérrez (born 1973), Spanish fantasy genre filmmaker
Francisco Javier Hernández Gonzalez (born 1989), Spanish professional football player
Francisco Javier Illán Vivas (born 1958), Spanish writer and poet
Francisco Javier Jusué (born 1979), Spanish professional football player
Francisco Javier Lledó (born 1979), Spanish professional football player
Francisco Javier López Díaz (born 1988), Spanish professional football player
Francisco Javier López García (born 1951), Spanish professional football player
Francisco Javier López Peña (a.k.a. Thierry) (born 1948), Basque separatist leader
Francisco Javier Mayorga Castañeda (born 1951), Mexican businessman and politician; government minister
Francisco Javier Mina (1789–1817), Spanish lawyer and army officer and Mexican revolutionary
Francisco Javier Peral (born 1983), Spanish professional football player
Francisco Javier Ramírez Acuña (born 1952), Mexican politician; Governor of Jalisco; government minister
Francisco Javier Rodríguez Vílchez (born 1978), Spanish professional football player
Francisco Javier Rodríguez (born 1981), Mexican professional football player
Francisco Javier Salazar Sáenz (contemporary), Mexican politician; government minister
Francisco Javier Sánchez Broto (born 1971), Spanish professional footballer
Francisco Javier Torres (born 1983), Mexican professional football player
Francisco Javier Uría (born 1950), Spanish professional football player
Francisco Javier Venegas, marqués de la Reunión y de Nueva España (1760–1838), Spanish military officer and viceroy of New Spain 1810–13
Francisco Javier Vergara y Velasco (1860–1914), Colombian geographer, cartographer, and historian
Francisco Javier Zaldúa (Francisco Javier Martínez de Zaldúa y Racines) Colombian, lawyer and politician; President of Colombia 1882
Francisco León Franco (Francisco Javier León Franco) (1832–1880), Ecuadoran politician; vice president and president of Ecuador
Francisco López Alfaro (Francisco Javier López Alfaro) (born 1962), Spanish professional football player and manager
Francisco Martínez Marina (Francisco Xavier Martinez Marina) (1754–1833), Spanish jurist, historian. and priest
Francisco Martos (Francisco Javier Martos Espigares) (born 1984), Spanish professional football player, playing for Greece
Francisco Meléndez (Francisco Javier Melendez Villegas) (born 1964), Puerto Rican professional baseball player
Francisco Oliveras (Francisco Javier Oliveras) (born 1963), Puerto Rican professional baseball player
Francisco Ortiz Franco (Francisco Javier Ortiz Franco) (1954–2004), Mexican journalist; assassinated
Francisco Prieto (Francisco Javier Prieto) (born 1983), Chilean professional football player
Francisco Varela (Francisco Javier Varela García) (1946–2001), Chilean biologist, philosopher, and neuroscientist
Francisco Vargas (Mexican boxer) (Francisco Javier Vargas Peláez) (born 1984), Mexican Olympic boxer
Francisco Vidal Salinas (Francisco Javier Vidal Salinas) (born 1953), Chilean politician and government minister
Francisco Villarroya (Francisco Javier Pérez Villaroya) (born 1966), Spanish professional football player
Francisco Xavier Bogarin (1763–1830), Paraguayan priest involved in the independence movement of Paraguay
Francisco Xavier Castellanos (born 1953), Bolivian-American physician and neuroscientist
Francisco Xavier da Silva Pereira, Conde das Antas (1793–1852), Portuguese military officer in the Peninsular War against Napoleon
Francisco Xavier de Luna Pizarro (1780–1855), Peruvian priest and politician; briefly Interim President of Peru twice in 1822 and 1833
Francisco Xavier do Amaral (born 1937), East Timorese politician
Francisco Xavier Sepulveda (1742–1788), Mexican colonial soldier in the early days of Southern California
Francisco Yeste (Francisco Javier Yeste Navarro) (born 1979), Spanish professional football player
Franciszek Kasparek (Franciszek Ksawery Kasparek) (1844–1903), Polish jurist, professor of law, and rector of Kraków University
Franciszek Ksawery Branicki (1730–1819), Polish nobleman, magnate, and one of the leaders of the Targowica Confederation
Franciszek Ksawery Chomiński (died 1809), Polish politician and writer
Franciszek Ksawery Dmochowski (1762–1818), Polish Romantic novelist, poet, and translator
Franciszek Ksawery Drucki-Lubecki (1778–1846), Polish prince and government minister
Franciszek Ksawery Godebski (1801–1869), Polish writer and publicist
Franciszek Ksawery Lampi (1782–1852), Polish Romantic painter
Franciszek Ksawery Zachariasiewicz (1770–1845), Polish Roman Catholic bishop of Przemyśl
Franciszek Latinik (Franciszek Ksawery Latinik) (1864–1949), Polish general officer
François Baby (legislative councillor) (Charles François Xavier Baby) (1794–1864), Canadian seigneur, businessman, and legislative councillor
François de Laval (François-Xavier de Montmorency-Laval) (1623–1708), French prelate of the Roman Catholic Church; first bishop of New France
François de Robiano (François Xavier Jean-Marie de Robiano) (1778–1836), Belgian politician; governor of Antwerp province
François Roffiaen (Jean François Xavier Roffiaen) (1820–1898), Belgian landscape painter
François Tourte (François Xavier Tourte) (1747–1835), French watchmaker and archetier of classical instruments
François-Xavier-Anselme Trudel (1838–1890), Québécois politician
François-Xavier Archambault (1841–1893), Québécois lawyer and politician
François-Xavier Babineau (1825–1890), Canadian Catholic priest
François Xavier Bazin (1824–1865), French archetier; first of the Bazin dynasty
François-Xavier Bélanger (1833–1882), French Canadian naturalist and museum curator
François Xavier Bon de Saint Hilaire (1678–1761), president of the Court of Auditors of Montpelier; demonstrated the feasibility of making fabric from spider silk
François-Xavier Brunet (1868–1922), Canadian Roman Catholic priest and bishop
François-Xavier de Donnea (François Xavier Gustave Marie Joseph Corneille Hubert) (born 1941), Belgian politician, former mayor of Brussels; government minister
François-Xavier de Feller (1735–1802), Belgian author
François Xavier de Schwarz (1762–1826), French cavalry officer during the Revolutionary era
François-Xavier Dulac (François-Xavier Bonhomme dit Dulac) (1841–1890), Québécois farmer, merchant, and political figure
François-Xavier Fabre (1766–1837), French painter
François-Xavier Garneau (1809–1866), French Canadian notary, poet, civil servant, and historian of French Canada
François-Xavier Larue (1763–1855), Canadian farmer, notary, and political figure in Lower Canada
François-Xavier Lemieux (Quebec MLA) (1851–1933), Québécois lawyer, judge, and political figure
François-Xavier Lemieux (1811–1864), French Canadian lawyer and politician
François-Xavier Malhiot (1781–1854), Canadian merchant, seigneur and political figure in Lower Canada
François-Xavier-Marc-Antoine de Montesquiou-Fézensac (1757–1832), French politician
Francois Xavier Martin (1762–1846), American jurist and author; first Attorney General of State of Louisiana; Justice of the Louisiana Supreme Court
François-Xavier Méthot (1796–1853), Québécois businessman and political figure
François-Xavier Nzuwonemeye (contemporary), Rwandan soldier, known for his alleged role in the Rwandan Genocide
François-Xavier Ortoli (1925–2007), French Gaullist politician and businessman
François-Xavier-Ovide Méthot (1843–1908), Québécois farmer and politician
François-Xavier Paradis (1844–1910), Canadian politician
François-Xavier Poizat (born 1989), French classical pianist
François-Xavier Roth (born 1971), French orchestra conductor
François-Xavier Tessier (1799–1835), Canadian doctor, publisher, and political figure in Lower Canada
François-Xavier Verschave (1945–2005), French economist, cofounder of the French NGO Survie
François-Xavier Villain (born 1950), French politician
François-Xavier Wurth-Paquet (1801–1885), Luxembourgian politician, jurist, and archaeologist
Frank Burke (Medal of Honor recipient) (Francis Xavier Burke) (1918–1988), American army officer; recipient of the Medal of Honor
Frank Castellano, (Francis Xavier Castellano) (contemporary), American naval officer
Frank Costigan (Francis Xavier Costigan) (1931–2009), Australian lawyer, chairman of the Costigan Commission
Frank Flood (Francis Xavier Flood) (1901–1921), Irish fighter in the Dublin Active Service Brigade during the Irish War of Independence
Frank McCloskey (Francis Xavier McCloskey) (1939–2003), American politician from Indiana; U.S. representative
Frank Reagan (Francis Xavier Reagan) (born 1919), American professional football player
Frank Richter, Sr. (Francis Xavier Richter), (1837–1910), pioneer settler, miner and rancher in Washington and British Columbia
Frank Richter, Jr. (Francis Xavier Richter), (1910–1977), Canadian politician from British Columbia
Frank Shields (Francis Xavier Shields), (1909–1975), American amateur tennis player
Frank Warfield (Francis Xavier Warfield) (1895–1932), American professional baseball player and manager in the Negro leagues
Frank X. Schwab (1874–1946), American politician from New York; mayor of Buffalo, New York
Frankie J (Francisco Javier Bautista, Jr.) (born 1975), Mexican American popular singer
Frans Seda (Franciscus Xaverius Seda) (1926–2009), Indonesian finance minister under Sukarno and Suharto
František Xaver Dušek (Franz Xaver Duschek) (1731–1799), Czech composer, harpsichordist, and pianist
Franz Biebl (Franz Xaver Biebl) (1906–2001), German composer of classical music
Franz Gruber (Franz Xaver Gruber) (1787–1863), Austrian school teacher and church organist; co-composer of the song “Stille Nacht, heilige Nacht”, (“Silent Night”)
Franz Schönhuber (Franz Xaver Schönhuber) (1923–2005), German journalist and author
Franz Xaver Dieringer (1811–1876), German Roman Catholic theologian
Franz Xaver Feuchtmayer the Younger (born 1735, died unknown), Baroque artist associated with the Wessobrunner School
Franz Xaver Feuchtmayer (1698–1763), German Baroque stucco plasterer of the Wessobrunner School
Franz Xaver Fieber (1807–1872), German botanist and entomologist
Franz Xaver Gabelsberger (1789–1849), German inventor of a shorthand writing system named Gabelsberger shorthand
Franz Xaver Gebel (1787–1843), German composer, music teacher, and conductor
Franz Xaver Gerl (1764–1827), Bavarian bass singer and composer of the Classical era
Franz Xaver Haberl (1840–1910), German musicologist
Franz Xaver Hammer (1741–1817), German gambist, cellist, and composer
Franz Xaver Josef von Unertl (1675–1750), Bavarian politician
Franz Xaver Kraus (1840–1901), German Catholic priest and art historian
Franz Xaver Kroetz (born 1946), German German author, playwright, actor, and film director
Franz Xaver Kugler (1862–1929), German  chemist, mathematician, Assyriologist, and Jesuit priest
Franz Xaver Messerschmidt (1736–1783), German-Austrian sculptor
Franz Xaver Murschhauser (1663–1738), German composer and music theorist
Franz Xaver Nagl (1855–1913), Cardinal of the Roman Catholic Church and Archbishop of Vienna
Franz Xaver Neruda (1843–1915), Moravian-born Danish cellist and composer
Franz Xaver Niemetschek (1766–1849), Czech philosopher, teacher, and music critic
Franz Xaver Reimspiess (1900–1979), Austrian mechanical engineer
Franz Xaver Reithmayr (1809–1872), German Catholic theologian and exegete
Franz Xaver Richter (1709–1789), Moravian composer
Franz Xaver Riepl (1790–1847), Austrian geologist, and railway and metallurgical specialist
Franz Xaver Schmid (Franz Xaver Schmid-Schwarzenberg) (1819–1883), Austrian-German educator and philosopher
Franz Xaver Schwarz (1875–1947), German politician who served as Reichsschatzmeister (National Treasurer) of the Nazi Party
Franz Xaver Süssmayr (1766–1803), Austrian composer
Franz Xaver von Baader (1765–1841), German Roman Catholic philosopher and theologian
Franz Xaver von Funk (1840–1907), German Catholic theologian
Franz Xaver von Hertling (1780–1844), Bavarian lieutenant general and War Minister 1836–38
Franz Xaver von Linsenmann (1835–1898), German Catholic moral theologian
Franz Xaver von Wulfen (1728–1805), Austrian botanist, mineralogist, alpinist, and Jesuit priest
Franz Xaver von Zach (1754–1832), Hungarian-born German astronomer
Franz Xaver Wagenschön (1726–1790), Czech-Austrian painter of the Rococo and Neoclassical styles
Franz Xaver Winterhalter (1805–1873), German painter and lithographer
Franz Xaver Witt (1834–1888), Bavarian Catholic priest, church musician, and composer
Franz Xaver Wolfgang Mozart (1791–1844), German composer, pianist, and conductor; son of Wolfgang Amadeus Mozart
Franz Xavier Wernz (1842–1914), German Superior General of the Society of Jesus
Frédéric-François-Xavier Ghislain de Mérode (1820–1874), Belgian prelate, archbishop and statesman of the Papal states
Georges-François-Xavier-Marie Grente (1872–1959), French Cardinal of the Roman Catholic Church
Henri François Xavier de Belsunce de Castelmoron (1671–1755), French Jesuit priest; Bishop of Marseille
Henri François Xavier Gresley (1819–1890), French Minister of War 1878–79
Infante Anthony of Portugal (António Francisco Xavier Benedito Teodósio Leopoldo Henrique) (1695–1757), Portuguese infante
Infante Antonio Pascual of Spain (Antonio Pascual Francisco Javier Juan Nepomuceno Aniello Raimundo Silvestre de Borbón y Sajonia) (1755–1817), Infante of Spain
J. F. X. O'Brien (James Francis Xavier O'Brien) (1828–1905), Irish nationalist Fenian revolutionary
Xavi Pérez (Francisco Javier Pérez Pérez) (born 1984), Spanish professional football player
Javi Ruiz (Francisco Javier Ruiz Bonilla) (born 1980), Spanish professional football player
Javier Aramendia (Francisco Javier Aramendia Llorente) (born 1986), Spanish road bicycle racer
Javier Bosma (Francisco Javier Bosma Mínguez) (born 1969), Spanish Olympic beach volleyball player
Javier Casquero (Francisco Javier Casquero Paredes) (born 1976), Spanish professional football player
Javier Castillejo (Francisco Javier Castillejo) (born 1968), Spanish professional boxer
Javier Chica (Francisco Javier Chica Torres) (born 1985), Spanish professional football player
Javier de Burgos (Francisco Javier de Burgos y del Olmo) (1778–1849), Spanish jurist, politician, journalist, and translator
Javier de Pedro (Francisco Javier de Pedro Falque) (born 1973), Spanish professional football player
Javier Farinós (Francisco Javier Farinós Zapata) (born 1978), Spanish professional football player
Javier Garciadiego (Francisco Javier Garciadiego Dantán) (born 1951), Mexican historian
Javier Mendiburu (Francisco Javier Mendiburu Urgell) (born 1980), Spanish professional basketball player
Javier Navarro (Francisco Javier Vicente Navarro) (born 1974), Spanish professional football player
Javier Ruibal (Francisco Javier Ruibal de Flores Calero) (born 1955), Spanish musician and songwriter
Javier Rupérez (Francisco Javier Rupérez Rubio) (born 1941), Spanish politician, diplomat, and writer
Javier Solana (Francisco Javier Solana de Madariaga) (born 1942), Spanish diplomat; Secretary General of NATO from 1995 to 1999
Javier Tarantino (Francisco Javier Tarantino Uriarte) (born 1984), Spanish professional football player
Javier Urruticoechea (Francisco Javier González Urruticoechea) (1952–2001), Spanish Basque professional football player
Javier Yubero (Francisco Javier Yubero Solanilla) (1972–2005), Spanish professional football player
Johann Franz Xaver Sterkel (1750–1817), German composer and pianist
Johannes von Nepomuk Franz Xaver Gistel (1809–1873), German naturalist
John VI of Portugal (João Maria José Francisco Xavier de Paula Luís António Domingos Rafael de Bragança) (1767–1826), King of the United Kingdom of Portugal, Brazil and the Algarves
John Davoren (John Francis Xavier Davoren) (1915–1997), American politician from Massachusetts
Joseph Droz (François-Xavier-Joseph Droz) (1773–1850), French writer on ethics, political science and, political economy
Kriengsak Kovitvanit (Francis Xavier Kriengsak Kovitvanit ) (born 1949), Archbishop of Bangkok
Ksawery Lubomirski (Franciszek Ksawery Lubomirski) (1747–1829), Polish nobleman and Russian general
Liam Pickering (Liam Francis Xavier Pickering) (born 1968), Australian rules footballer
Lorenzo Maria of Saint Francis Xavier (1782–1856), Italian priest of the Roman Catholic Church; beatified by Pope John Paul II in 1999
Louis Joseph, Dauphin of France (Louis Joseph Xavier François of France) (1781–1789), son of King Louis XVI of France and Marie Antoinette; heir apparent to the French throne
Marie François Xavier Bichat (1771–1802), French anatomist and physiologist
Mary Francis Xavier Warde (1810–1884), Irish nun of the Sisters of Mercy
Moose Goheen (Francis Xavier Goheen) (1894–1979), American amateur ice hockey player
Nguyen Van Thuan (François-Xavier Nguyễn Văn Thuận) (1928–2002), Vietnamese Cardinal of the Roman Catholic Church
Paco Clos (Francisco Javier Clos Orozco) (born 1960), Spanish professional football player
Paco Vidarte (Francisco Javier Vidarte Fernández) (1970–2008), Spanish philosopher, writer, and LGBT activist
Pantera (wrestler) (Francisco Javier Pozas) (born 1964), Mexican professional wrestler
Patxi Vila (Francisco Javier Vila Errandonea) (born 1975), Spanish Basque professional bicycle road racer
Pierre François Xavier de Charlevoix (1682–1761), French Jesuit traveller and historian; first historian of New France
Pierre François Xavier de Ram (1804–1865), Belgian Roman Catholic prelate and historian
Pope Pius VIII (Francesco Saverio Castiglioni) (1761–1830)
Prince Francis Xavier of Saxony (1730–1806), German prince and member of the House of Wettin
Prince Friedrich Franz Xaver of Hohenzollern-Hechingen (1757–1844), Austrian military general
Regis Philbin (Regis Francis Xavier Philbin) (born 1931), American television personality
Sugi Sito (Francisco Javier Mar Hernández) (1926–2000), Mexican professional wrestler
Thomas F. X. Smith (1928–1996), American reformist politician and author; mayor of Jersey City, New Jersey
Tommaso Traetta (Tommaso Michele Francesco Saverio Traetta) (1729–1779), Italian composer
Xabier Azkargorta (Francisco Xabier Azcargorta Uriarte) (born 1953), Spanish professional football player and manager
Xaver Scharwenka (Franz Xaver Scharwenka) (1850–1924), Polish-German pianist, composer, and teacher
Xavier Atencio (Francis Xavier Atencio) (born 1919), animator and Imagineer for The Walt Disney Company
Xavier Connor (Francis Xavier Connor) (1917–2005), Australian jurist
Xavier Dirceu (Dirceu Francisco Xavier) (born 1977), Brazilian professional football player
Xavier, Duke of Parma (Francis Xavier, Duke of Parma and Piacenza) (1889–1977)
Xavier Haegy (François Xavier Haegy) (1870–1932), Alsatian priest, journalist, and politician
Xavier Hernandez (baseball) (Francis Xavier Hernandez) (The X-Man) (born 1965), American professional baseball player
Xavier Roca Mateo (Francesc Xavier Roca Mateo) (born 1974), Spanish professional football player
Xisco (footballer born 1980) (Francisco Javier Muñoz Llompart) (born 1980), Spanish professional football player
Xisco Campos (Francisco Javier Campos Coll) (born 1982), Spanish professional football player

Fictional persons
Frank Pembleton (Francis Xavier Pembleton), character on the television series Homicide: Life on the Street
Professor X, (Professor Charles Francis Xavier), Marvel Comics superhero
Trapper John McIntyre (John Francis Xavier McIntyre), character of the novels, film, and television series M*A*S*H

See also
St. Francis Xavier (disambiguation)
St. Francis Xavier Church (disambiguation)
St. Xavier (disambiguation)
San Javier (disambiguation)
Xavier (disambiguation)